Bryant is an unincorporated community in northeastern Clinton County, Iowa, United States. It lies along local roads northwest of the city of Clinton, the county seat of Clinton County.  Its elevation is 804 feet (245 m).  Bryant is unincorporated, with the ZIP code of 52727, which opened as Ten Mile House on 25 August 1870 and changed its name to Bryant on 15 March 1871.

History
Bryant was platted in 1871. It was named for William Cullen Bryant, a New York newspaper editor.

References

Unincorporated communities in Clinton County, Iowa
Unincorporated communities in Iowa
1871 establishments in Iowa
Populated places established in 1871